Voice: The Future Is Now is the first studio album by the South Korean boy group Victon. Originally scheduled for release on December 1, 2020, it was released on January 11, 2021 by Play M Entertainment.

Background and release 
On November 4, 2020, Victon's first full studio album was announced, scheduled for release on December 1 and titled Voice: The Future Is Now. However, the album was delayed until January 11, 2021, due to the group's quarantine following contact with a staff member that had tested positive for COVID-19.

The album includes thirteen songs, including the title track "What I Said" and four solo songs, one each from Kang Seung-sik, Heo Chan, Lim Se-jun, and Do Han-se respectively.

The music video for the lead single "What I Said" was released on the same day as the album's release. Victon subsequently released a performance video for the single and performance video for the song "Flip a Coin" on January 16 and 18 respectively.

Critical reception
Kim Do-yeon of IZM noted that the album was a departure in style from their earlier work, including by mixing a Latin-inspired brass instrumental with the trap beat. Kim described it as the result of a successful mix of unpredictability and experimentation. Tamar Herman of the South China Morning Post described it as "sleekly produced and also contemplative, with the members ruminating on their careers and the ups and downs of life."

Commercial performance	
The album debuted at number four on the weekly Gaon Album chart and number eight on the monthly chart. The album set a new record for the group for their highest first week sales with 71,390 copies sold, and by February the album had sold 107,774 copies in South Korea. "What I Said" also debuted on Billboard's World Digital Song Sales Chart at number twenty-one.

Track listing

Charts

Album

Weekly charts

Monthly chart

Year-end chart

Songs

Weekly chart

Sales

References 

2021 albums
Victon albums
Korean-language albums